Kylie's Secret Night is a British Christmas television special featuring Australian recording artist Kylie Minogue. It was produced by BBC Studios and was hosted by comedian Alan Carr. The show was created as a way of thanks from Minogue to her fans, filmed in front of an audience who believed they had been invited to a "Kylie-themed fan extravaganza" but were surprised with an evening with her.

Kylie's Secret Night aired on Channel 4 on 25 December 2019 in the United Kingdom. It also aired on TVNZ 1 on 26 December in New Zealand, and on SBS on 8 February in Australia.

Background 
The show featured Carr interviewing the singer, as well as performances, gifts, hidden camera pranks and stunts. Part of the show involved Minogue paying a surprise visit to a musical theatre group made up of adults with autism and learning disabilities. She also shared a taxi with members of the public, with Carr directing her actions via a hidden earpiece. Speaking about the special, Minogue said:

Kylie's Secret Night aired on 25 December 2019, followed by the television premiere of her Golden Tour.

Performances 
"Can't Get You Out of My Head"
"Dancing"
"Hand on Your Heart" 
"On a Night Like This"
"All the Lovers"

References

External links 

2019 television specials
British television specials
Channel 4 original programming
Christmas television specials
Kylie Minogue
Television series by BBC Studios